Michael Marton (born 10 January 1937) is an Israeli former sports shooter. He competed in the 50 metre pistol event at the 1968 Summer Olympics in Mexico City, Mexico. He ranked at 47th place in 69 participants, with a total score of 530 points.

References

1937 births
Living people
Israeli male sport shooters
Olympic shooters of Israel
Shooters at the 1968 Summer Olympics
Sportspeople from Cluj-Napoca